is a Japanese voice actress. She formerly worked at Aoni Production and is now a director at Kekke Corporation. She is married to voice actor Keiichi Nanba.

Filmography

Television animation
Adventures of the Little Koala (1984) (Mimi)
High School! Kimengumi (1985) (Kiri Ichidou)
Dragon Ball (1986) (Chi-Chi)
Maison Ikkoku (1986) (Ikuko Otonashi)
Mobile Suit Gundam ZZ (1986) (Haro and Qum)
Lady!! (1987) (Mary Wavebury)
Ai no Wakakusa Monogatari (1987) (Beth March)
Kimagure Orange Road (1987) (Kumiko Oda)
Kiteretsu Daihyakka (1988) (Miyoko Nonoka (1st voice))
Oishinbo (1988) (Yūko Kurita)
Dragon Ball Z (1989) (Chi-Chi (1st voice))
The Kindaichi Case Files (1998) (Naoko Torimaru) (ep 51-54)
Konjiki no Gash Bell!! (2003) (Sherry's Mother)
Futari wa Pretty Cure (2004) (Rie Misumi)
Welcome to the N.H.K. (2006) (Satou Shizue)
Love Com (2007) (Umibozu's wife)

OVA
Fight! Iczer One (1985) (Nagisa Kanou)
Dancouga – Super Beast Machine God (1985) (Sayuri Michinaga)
Megazone 23 (1985) (Mai Yumekano)
Dangaioh (1987) (Mia Alice)
Appleseed (1988) (Hitomi)
Space Family Carlvinson (1988) (Corona)
Hades Project Zeorymer (1988) (Yuratei)

Theatrical animation
Lupin III: The Plot of the Fuma Clan (1987) (Murasaki Suminawa)
Saint Seiya: The Movie (1987) (Eri Aizawa)
Mobile Suit Gundam: Char's Counterattack (1988) (Cheimin Noa)
Dragon Ball Z: Dead Zone (1989) (Chi-Chi)
Dragon Ball Z: The World's Strongest (1990) (Chi-Chi)
Dragon Ball Z: The Tree of Might (1990) (Chi-Chi)
Dragon Ball Z: Lord Slug (1991) (Chi-Chi)
Dragon Ball Z: Cooler's Revenge (1991) (Chi-Chi)
Doraemon: Nobita Drifts in the Universe (1999) (Freyja)

Video games
Golden Axe (1989) (Princess consort)
Ys I & II (1989) (Reah)
Final Zone II (1990) (Ling Momoko)
Death Bringer (1992) (Claudia)
Dragon Ball Z: Budokai (2002) (Chi-Chi)

Dubbing
The NeverEnding Story (The Childlike Empress (Tami Stronach))

References

Kekke Corporation

External links
 
 

1965 births
Voice actresses from Tokyo
Japanese video game actresses
Japanese voice actresses
Living people
20th-century Japanese actresses
21st-century Japanese actresses
Aoni Production voice actors